Heather Cooper (born 9 May 1995) is an Australian handball player for Queensland HC and on both, Australian national team and the beach handball team teams.

Indoor handball career
She is part of the Queensland state team for the Australian Championships and contributed to obtaining a gold medal in 2013 & 2014 and a silver medal in 2016.

Beach handball career
She is part of the Queensland state team and contributed to winning gold during the Australian Championships 2015 and Silver in 2013, 2016 & 2017.
2015 : Australian Beach Handball Championships – All Star Team (Best Left Wing attack)
2016 : Australian Beach Handball Championships – All Star Team (Best Left Wing defense)

International indoor handball career
She has been part of the Australian Junior team since 2012 and was selected to represent Australia with the Senior team at the Oceania Qualifiers in Australia (2016) and in New Zealand (2013) as well as the 4 Nations Tournament in Kazakhstan (2015).

International beach handball career
Currently selected in the Australian Team for the 2017 World Games, she was part of the Australian team that secured an 8th position at World Championships in Hungary, July 2016 and also participated to the World Championships 2014 in Brazil.

References

Australian female handball players
People educated at John Paul College (Brisbane)
1995 births
Living people